BB U OK? (stylized as bb u ok?) is the second studio album by Dutch musician San Holo, released on 4 June 2021 by Bitbird, Counter Records, and Liquid State.

Production 
The album was recorded from September 2019 to January 2020. Similarly to Album1, it was recorded in an Airbnb in Los Angeles, this time in Echo Park. He explained: "I wrote bb u ok? during a new chapter of my life after that relationship ended. I was learning how to deal with what happens 'after love'. I flew to LA and just started writing and writing, trying to express everything I had been feeling for the last few months. The change in scenery definitely helped, going back to LA (like I did for album1) brought back some good memories of that previous chapter." San Holo expected to release the album still in 2020, but that was not possible due to the COVID-19 pandemic.

Composition 

In an interview, San Holo declared that BB U OK? was his most personal project ever, which is "just me trying to experiment in a more indie direction, keeping the same sonic elements and feelings as a San Holo song." He also declared that, while Album1 was "me being in love", BB U OK? "definitely has an after love vibe. Not to say a bad vibe, but more like an 'Okay, what happens after that relationship and how do you deal with it, how do you move on?' The bittersweetness of that, the beautiful memories yet the sad fact that it didn't work out, for example."

San Holo declared the album is "post-EDM, with influences from indie and post-rock." Dancing Astronaut said "[t]he LP is polished with contemporary musical influences including indie-electronic, ambient, lo-fi, and future-bass. The collection as a whole spotlights San Holo’s signature guitar progressions, spectral synth leads, and unfiltered lyricism."

The album's title is "a reminder to ask others how they're feeling". San Holo further clarified that he felt that, even though everyone was connected with social media and phones, "I feel like we're so disconnected in a way".

Release 
On 5 November 2020, San Holo announced social media hiatus, "to clear my mind and live in the moment a little more". He also declared: "Let's start a new chapter soon!" 21 days later, he announced the release of the single "BB U OK?" for 1 December, which started "a new chapter" in his career. The song was San Holo's first release on Counter Records.

On 27 January 2021, he teased the "biggest announcement in San Holo history", to occur on 3 February. The announcement was his second studio album, BB U OK?, along with a second single, "Find Your Way". The album was initially set to be released on 21 May via Bitbird, his own independent label, and Counter Records. He then released "It Hurts!" on 10 March, and "Black and White / My Fault" on 14 April. On 6 May, San Holo announced that the album was delayed to 4 June. On 22 May, he released "You've Changed, I've Changed", with Chet Porter. On 24 May, he announced a North American tour to promote the album.

BB U OK? was released on 4 June 2021, with vinyl, cassette tape and CD formats.

Reception 

OOR said the album has "great songs" and declared: "BB U OK? perhaps breathes the attic room where Sander van Dijck learned to play the guitar rather than the dance floors where San Holo triumphed. Of course, that could be completely different on the third." de Volkskrant gave the album a 4 out of 5 rating. According to Your EDM Matthew Meadow, "[t]he combination of San’s bleeding-heart guitar chords, processed vocals, and delicate synths serenade throughout the album, more pronounced, more nuanced, more meaningful than ever before." Dancing Astronaut said the album "is a graceful journey through the Dutch producer's discerning process of falling in and out of love, as San Holo picks up the pieces through 20 heart-felt tracks, offering a musical expression that breaks down his feelings in the most raw and authentic manner." PopMatters said "almost every track plays out like its own self-contained grief cycle, with sadness turning to anger followed by a beautiful release that is ultimately cathartic."

Track listing 
All tracks are engineered and mixed by Sander van Dijck; "The Great Clown Pagliacci" also mixed by Tim Biesta.

Notes
 Tracks are stylized in all lowercase, except "It Hurts!", "My Fault", and "Feels Right" which are stylized in all caps, and "Lonely in LA" and "The Great Clown Pagliacci" which are stylized "lonely in LA" and "the great clown Pagliacci" respectively.

Charts

References 

2021 albums
San Holo albums